Víctor Molina (2 November 1924 – 1999) was a Venezuelan equestrian. He competed in two events at the 1956 Summer Olympics.

References

External links
 

1924 births
1999 deaths
Venezuelan male equestrians
Olympic equestrians of Venezuela
Equestrians at the 1956 Summer Olympics
Place of birth missing
20th-century Venezuelan people